Teresa Mannion (born 1961) is an Irish journalist and broadcaster. She has worked as a broadcast news reporter since 2000 and is currently the RTÉ News and Current Affairs reporter based in the West of Ireland since 2007.

In December 2015, Mannion's live reporting from Galway during Storm Desmond went on to go viral online. Her subsequent rise in fame led to becoming a contestant on the first Irish series of Dancing with the Stars.

Career
Mannion worked in children's television in the 1980s. Mannion has been reporting for RTÉ News in various positions since the 1990s. She also frequently reports for the Nationwide magazine programme.

Storm Desmond
Mannion reported for RTÉ One from Salthill during Storm Desmond. Footage from the reports for Six One and Nine O'Clock News, both raw and altered (merged with fictional storms, or songified) was shared over social media, and soon became a viral phenomenon.

Mannion was interviewed by Ryan Tubridy's The Late Late Show and Seven Network's The Morning Show about her new-found fame. She was a contestant on Dancing with the Stars in 2017.

Personal life
Mannion was raised in Ballygall in the northern suburbs of Dublin city and lived for a time in Terenure. She attended St. Mary's Holy Faith secondary school. Mannion is married to journalist Dave O’Connell, they have two sons. Mannion is a survivor of triple-negative breast cancer (TNBC).

References

External links
 

1961 births
Living people
Mass media people from Dublin (city)
Ballygall
Salthill
Irish women journalists
Irish women radio presenters
RTÉ newsreaders and journalists